Montenegro competed at the 2022 Winter Olympics in Beijing, China, from 4 to 20 February 2022.

The Montenegro team consisted of three athletes (two men and one woman) competing in two sports, equaling the team size from PyeongChang 2018. Eldar Salihović and Jelena Vujicic were the country's flagbearer during the opening ceremony. Meanwhile a volunteer was the flagbearer during the closing ceremony.

Competitors
The following is the list of number of competitors participating at the Games per sport/discipline.

Alpine skiing

By meeting the basic qualification standards, Montenegro qualified one male and one female alpine skier.

Cross-country skiing

By meeting the basic qualification standards, Montenegro qualified one male cross-country skier.

Distance

Sprint

References

Nations at the 2022 Winter Olympics
2022
Winter Olympics